Giles Alington ( 29 May 1914 – 24 February 1956) was a Fellow of University College, Oxford, from 1944 to 1956.

Biography
Alington was eldest son of the Very Revd Dr Cyril Alington, headmaster of Eton College, Shrewsbury School, and dean at Durham Cathedral, and his wife, Hester Margaret, née Lyttelton. 

His father came from a long line of clerics, a branch of the landed gentry Alington family of Little Barford Manor House, St Neots, Huntingdonshire, and was descended from the Alingtons of Horseheath, an ancient Cambridgeshire family, from which also descended the Barons Alington.

Before World War II, Alington was assistant secretary of the National Association of Probation Officers. Alington was unable to join up during World War II due to ill health. Instead, he helped Arthur Goodhart as coordinator of the wartime Short Leave Courses at Balliol College, Oxford.

Alington was a dominant figure amongst the fellows at University College in the post-war years. He was appointed Dean of the College in 1945 and also Senior Tutor from 1948 until his death. He was not very academic (achieving a Third in his degree), but was well liked by students for his patrician manner, and he also had administrative ability. While in Oxford, he was also a magistrate and a member of the Visiting Justices' Committee at Oxford Prison.

John Wild was Master of University College from 1945 to 1951, during much of Alington's time as a Fellow at the College. Wild went on to succeed Giles Alington's father, Cyril Alington, as Dean of Durham Cathedral.

Death
Giles Alington died at the age of 41.

The Alington Room at University College is named in his memory.

He had three surviving sisters, Lavinia, Joan and Elizabeth. Lavinia was married to the academic Roger Mynors. Joan was married to John Vaughan Wilkes and was the mother of another academic Kathy Wilkes. Elizabeth married Alec Douglas-Home, British Prime Minister. 

Another Prime Minister, Harold Wilson, who had connections with University College, was also a friend and colleague. Harold and Mary Wilson named their son Giles after Alington.

References

1914 births
1956 deaths
Fellows of University College, Oxford
English justices of the peace